OMR may stand for:

 Galería OMR, a gallery in Mexico City
 Ohio Military Reserve, the state defense force of Ohio
 Old Mahabalipuram Road, a transport corridor in Chennai City
 Omani rial, by ISO 4217 currency code
 Optical mark recognition, a data-capture technology
 Optical music recognition
 Oradea International Airport (IATA code)
 Organically moderated and cooled reactor
 Outermost region, a region which is part of a European Union Member State, is situated outside of Europe and is fully part of the EU
 OMR, a 2022 album by Omar Rudberg